South Quay-USJ 1 BRT station is a bus rapid transit (BRT) station on the BRT Sunway Line. The station is located behind Mydin USJ 1 and serves the nearby Casa Subang apartments and the shopping malls around it.

Like other BRT stations on this line, the station is elevated.

Gallery

Around the station
 Mydin Wholesale Hypermarket
 Giant Subang Jaya
 USJ Wholesale City

References 

Bus rapid transit in Malaysia
Buildings and structures in Selangor
2015 establishments in Malaysia